Putaqa Hirka (Quechua putaqa Rumex peruanus, Ancash Quechua hirka mountain, "Rumex peruanus mountain", also spelled Putacajirca) is a mountain in the eastern extensions of the Cordillera Blanca in the Andes of Peru which reaches a height of approximately . It is located in the Ancash Region, Huari Province, on the border of the districts of Cajay and Masin.

References

Mountains of Peru
Mountains of Ancash Region